Independence Cup is a cup competition in men's association football. The competition started in 1972 and is run by the Bangladesh Football Federation, which is responsible for all types of competitive matches in the country. The teams from the country's premier league and other clubs compete in the tournament. Most of the matches are played in the country's main football venue Bangabandhu National Stadium.

Results

Statistics

Top goalscorers by season

Sponsors

References

 
Football cup competitions in Bangladesh
National association football cups